The Wa National Organisation (WNO) is a political organisation in Shan State, Myanmar. It has an armed wing, the Wa National Army (WNA), that operates in northern Shan State and near Myanmar's border with Thailand.

History
The WNO was founded along with the WNA on 29 July 1974, after the original group, the Ka Kwe Ye, joined forces with the Shan State Army (SSA) and Lo Hsing Han. The group was led by Mahasang, the son of the last sawbwa of Vingngun.

In 1977, the WNO broke ties with the SSA and allied themselves with the 3rd Kuomintang battalion operating near the Myanmar-China border, led by General Li Wenhuan. In 1983, the WNO officially joined the National Democratic Force (NDF).

The group signed a peace agreement with the SLORC government in August 1997.

References

See also
Internal conflict in Myanmar
List of insurgent groups in Myanmar

Wa people
Rebel groups in Myanmar